Orme Park is a  park in Atlanta, Georgia. It is located along Clear Creek in the Virginia Highland neighborhood.

2011 renovation
In 2011 a $203,000 renovation was completed, funded by "Friends of Orme Park", the Virginia-Highland Conservation League, the City of Atlanta, and a grant from Park Pride.  This change consisted of a new entry plaza, stairway, and gently sloping sidewalks that provide wheelchair access and a safer landing area for entry into the park off Brookridge Drive. The playground was relocated and a granite seating wall was built. A walkway connecting the two entrances on Brookridge Drive was constructed where a dirt path previously existed.  An additional Park Pride grant will enable completion in 2012 of tree recompense, a rain garden and granite seat wall, additional plantings, and a new masonry sign.

External links
 "Orme Park Visioning Plan", Park Pride
 Jack White, "Orme Park Master Plan Takes Shape", Virginia-Highland Voice, Winter 2008

References

Parks in Atlanta
Virginia-Highland